Shimon Dovid Cowen (born 7 September 1951) is an Australian rabbi and academic. He is known for his research on, and advocacy for, the Noahide Laws, on the basis of which, he has publicly opposed homosexuality, looser abortion laws and voluntary assisted dying legislation.

He is affiliated with Chabad Hasidism, a branch of ultra-Orthodox Judaism, and is the son of the former Governor General of Australia, Sir Zelman Cowen.

Education 
Cowen was born in Melbourne, Victoria, concluding his secondary education in New South Wales before attending the Australian National University in Canberra. His studies took him to the University of Munich and Monash University, from which he received a PhD in social philosophy in 1984.

For a number of years he was a member of the Kollel Menachem Lubavitch, a tertiary Rabbinic Institute, where he became director of community educational programs. He received rabbinic ordination from Rabbis Chaim Gutnick and She’ar Yashuv Cohen He also taught in the Australian Centre for Jewish Civilization at Monash University.

Institute for Judaism and Civilization
In 1998 he founded, and continues to direct, the Institute for Judaism and Civilization. This institute was established to examine the “interface between Judaism and the arts, sciences and values of general society”.

Universal Ethics
In addition to exploring the interface between Judaism and society and culture, Cowen has made a major focus of his work, the study of the universal ethics, at the root of the world religions, which he elaborated upon in his book on the Noahide laws, The Theory and Practice of Universal Ethics – The Noahide Laws. Cowen has opposed Victoria's abortion laws that he claims is too liberal, and claims that these policies will "open the floodgates of barbarism". Victoria in 2017 introduced Australia’s first assisted suicide legislation, in which he saw further evidence of a loss of the moral compass of universal ethics and a new low point of civilization. He has also opposed homosexuality and euthanasia, as contraventions of the Noahide laws.

He claims that these ethics, at the root of the world religions, should inform all of humanity's action  and specifically be made known to political leaders and public political discourse.

In the Victorian State election of 2014 he strongly advocated for a vote for one of the conservative minor parties, Family First, DLP or the Australian Christians. He opposed voting for the major parties based on their support for same sex marriage.

He was also thanked by the DLP member of Victoria's Legislative Council, Rachel Carling-Jenkins during her maiden speech.

Views on homosexuality
Cowen is an open and vocal opponent of homosexuality, and more broadly campaigned against same sex marriage. The foundation premise of his book, Homosexuality, Marriage and Society, is that homosexuality has diverse causes (temperamental, psychological and cultural) extraneous to the essential person, the soul or conscience. Conscience is free to engage in a struggle with bodily impulse. He critiqued the move of the Victorian Government to appoint a Health Commissioner whose proposed job would, among other things, was intended to uproot “conversion therapy”. He called this ban an attack on patient autonomy, for those who wanted to enter such a program. Even though almost all psychiatrists and psychiatric organisations oppose conversion therapy as dangerous and potentially harmful to the life of the individual, Cowen has cited the report of the American Psychological Association on “Appropriate Therapeutic Responses to Sexual Orientation” (2009) that “There are no rigorously scientific sides of recent SOCE [Sexual Orientation change Efforts] that would enable us to make a definitive statement about whether recent SOCE is safe or harmful and for whom.”  He also quotes a former President of the APA, Nicholas A. Cummings in 2013 testifying to significant successful outcomes of conversion therapy. Cowen does not have psychiatric qualifications.

In 2010 the Victorian government established the Safe Schools Coalition, which was to be adopted nationally with the goals to reduce bullying of among others, non-heterosexual children. In 2012, Cowen opposed the “Safe Schools” program, as manipulating early childhood development against its ordinary, natural and moral norms, and that it would harm the normal sexual development of children.

The publication of his views on this question brought on moves to have him removed from his appointment at Monash University and resulted in a public statement of the University dissociating itself from Cowen's views. After Cowen protested this as an abridgment of academic freedom, the University confirmed and promoted his appointment to that of a Senior Honorary Associate of the University. The university publicly distanced themselves from Cowen's statements 

In 2015 Cowen disseminated his opposition to same-sex marriage, also via his Monash University email account. The University, this time under a new Vice-Chancellor, who had placed the entire University behind same-sex marriage in the public debate, revoked Cowen's appointment claiming inappropriate of university email. On the grounds that the University’s decision constituted a prima facie violation of the Act of Parliament establishing Monash University, which set out as one of its objects “promoting critical and free enquiry, informed intellectual discourse and public debate within the University and in the wider society”, Cowen pursued and then appealed a Freedom of Information decision about disclosure of the deliberations of the University leading to the dismissal. The presiding Magistrate found that “While I accept Dr Cowen's submission that freedom of academic expression and freedom to hold and practice religious beliefs in a university setting are important public interests, I reject his submission that the public interest requires that access should be given to the documents in contest in this proceeding.” 

At the September 25, 2017 "LGBTI Mental Health Forum" event organised by the Jewish Community Council of Victoria, Cowen compared same sex attraction to bestiality and paedophilia, incest and theft. Cowen claimed that he was "misunderstood" and apologised for the hurt his comments caused.

Publications
Seder bircas hanehenin (English translation of, and commentary on,  a classic work of Jewish law by Rabbi Schneur Zalman of Liadi (New York: Kehot, 1997). Second edition with revisions published 2007.

Jewish Thought in Context - Studies in the relationships of Jewish and secular thought, Melbourne: Monash University (Series: Monographs in Judaism and Civilization), 1998, 2000

Maimonides' Principles - Dialectics and the structure of Jewish belief, Melbourne: Monash University (Series: Monographs in Judaism and Civilization), 1998, 2000,

Judaism in the Prism of the Sciences, Melbourne: Monash University (Series: Monographs in Judaism and Civilization), 2001

The Rediscovery of the Human – Basic Texts of Viktor E. Frankl, Melbourne and Philadelphia: Institute for Judaism and Civilization, 2004. Revised and expanded second edition 2014.

Politics and Universal Ethics, Ballan: Connor Court Publishing, 2011 </ref>

There is more than this... Lectures for Campion College, Melbourne: Institute for Judaism and Civilization, 2015.

The Theory and Practice of Universal Ethics – the Noahide Laws, New York: Institute for Judaism and Civilization (printed by Kehot Publication Society), 2015 

Homosexuality, Marriage and Society, Redland Bay: Connor Court, 2016

Aesthetics and the Divine, Melbourne: Hybrid Publishers, 2017

The Human Being in the Image of the Divine – The Psychology of Viktor E. Frankl, Melbourne: Institute for Judaism and Civilization, 2017

The Theory of Knowledge – Perspectives from Sinai, Melbourne: Institute for Judaism and Civilization, 2017

Torah and the Natural Sciences, Melbourne: Institute for Judaism and Civilization, 2018

References

Noahides
1951 births
Living people
Australian Orthodox rabbis
20th-century Australian rabbis
21st-century Australian rabbis